Collins Adomako-Mensah is a Ghanaian politician and member of the New Patriotic Party. He represents Afigya Kwabre North Constituency in the 8th parliament of the 4th Republic in Ghana.

Early life and education 
Adomako Mensah was born on 2 November 1983 and hails from Boaman Maase in the Ashanti Region. He attended the Presbyterian Boy's Senior Secondary School, Legon for his secondary school education. He was awarded a  Bachelor of Arts degree in banking and finance and an Executive Master of Business Administration in 2007 and 2016 respectively.

Career and politics 
Adomako-Mensah has worked with financial institutions such as GCB, Fidelity bank as deputy manager and relationship manager. and member of the New Patriotic Party. During the 2020 NPP parliamentary primaries Adomako-Mensah  contested for the Afigya Kwabre North seat against the then MP,  Nana Marfo Amaniampong and won.  In the 2020 Ghanaian general elections, Adomako- Mensah won the seat with 20,441 votes representing 65.75% as against his opponent Emmanuel Jackson Agumah of the NDC who polled 10646 representing 34.25% of votes cast.

In November 2021, Adomako-Mensah donated mathematical sets and other stationery to candidates in the Afigya Kwabre North Constituency in the Ashanti region.

Committees 
Adomako-Mensah is a member of the finance committee and also a member of the health committee.

Personal life 
Adomako-Mensah is a Christian. He is the nephew of Albert Kan-Dapaah.

Controversy 
In 2020, he was alleged to have been involved in a GHS264,094 theft. He transferred some amount belonging to the Gen X Trading Company Limited to his company called AND Financial Services when he was the client service officer for the company. He did it between 2016 and 2017 without their permission and know-about.

References 

1983 births
Living people
Ghanaian MPs 2021–2025
New Patriotic Party politicians